Jessie Cross (April 14, 1909 – March 29, 1986) was an American athlete who competed mainly in the 100 metres.

She competed for the United States in the 1928 Summer Olympics held in Amsterdam, Netherlands in the 4 x 100 metres where she won the Silver medal with her team mates Mary Washburn, Loretta McNeil and Betty Robinson.

References

External links
 

1909 births
1986 deaths
American female sprinters
Athletes (track and field) at the 1928 Summer Olympics
Olympic silver medalists for the United States in track and field
Medalists at the 1928 Summer Olympics
20th-century American women
20th-century American people
Olympic female sprinters